Alexander or Alex Richardson may refer to:

Alexander Richardson (Puritan intellectual) (c1565-1613?)
Alexander Richardson (bobsledder) (1887–1964), bobsledder, silver medallist at the 1924 Winter Olympics
Alexander Richardson (MP) (1864–1928), British politician
Alexander Robert Richardson (1847–1931), Australian pastoralist and politician
Alex Richardson, founder of Netkey

See also
Alexandar Richardson (born 1990), British cyclist
Al Richardson (disambiguation)
Richardson (surname)